The Women's under-23 time trial at the 2009 European Road Championships took place on July 1. The Championships were hosted by the Belgian city of Hooglede-Gits. The course was 28.1 km long and had stone sections that were also uphill. The uphill part was seen as an important part of the course where you could easily lose seconds.

Team Columbia-HTC's Dutch women Ellen van Dijk won the U23 women's individual time trial for the second consecutive year. Van Dijk completed the 28-kilometre course in  a time of 36:41 (41.1 km/h), beating Swedish Emilia Fahlin, her teammate, by 20 seconds. She was very happy with the result because she suffered a concussion in April and was unable to cycle for almost six weeks, lowering her expectations for success.

Reactions
 Ellen van Dijk
"I am very happy, of course, I was very insecure about my fitness, but it seems I was able to succeed today, even after the lost training time. The course was quite long, with a couple of stone sections that were also uphill, and it was very hard near the end. The uphill was at a very important part of the course where you can easily lose a couple of seconds, but the wind was behind me, so that was a bit of help."

Final classification
In the time trial event competed in total 40 athletes.

References

2009 European Road Championships
European Road Championships – Women's U23 time trial
2009 in women's road cycling